"Mind of a Toy" is the third single by the British pop group Visage, released on Polydor Records in March 1981. It was taken from the band's eponymous debut album, following up their international hit "Fade to Grey".

Music video
The music video for the single was directed by former 10cc members Godley & Creme, who had branched out into video production by that time. The theme of the video was Steve Strange's idea, who decided on a Little Lord Fauntleroy look. In his autobiography, Blitzed!, Strange claimed that the video was banned by the BBC's Top of the Pops as it was considered to be "frightening for children", however it was actually screened on the show on 19 March 1981.

Track listing
 7" single (1981)
A. "Mind of a Toy" – 3:33
B. "We Move" – 4:00

 12" single (1981)
A. "Mind of a Toy" (Dance Mix) – 5:13
B1. "We Move" (Dance Mix) – 6:30
B2. "Frequency 7" (Dance Mix) – 5:02

Personnel
Steve Strange – lead vocals
Midge Ure – guitar, lead vocals
Billy Currie – synthesizer
John McGeoch – guitar
Rusty Egan – drums, electronic drums programming
Dave Formula – synthesizer

Chart performance

References

1981 singles
Songs written by Midge Ure
Visage (band) songs
1980 songs
Songs written by Steve Strange
Songs written by Billy Currie
Songs written by Rusty Egan
Songs written by Dave Formula
Polydor Records singles